Mike Austin may refer to:

Mike Austin (golfer) (1910–2005), English-American golfer
Mike Austin (swimmer) (born 1943), American swimmer

See also
Michael Austin (disambiguation)